John Blankenchip (November 14, 1919 – April 1, 2009) was a director, theater designer, and professor at the School of Theatre at the University of Southern California.

References

1919 births
2009 deaths
American theatre directors
University of Southern California faculty